Elin Pelin Point (‘Nos Elin Pelin’ \'nos e-'lin pe-'lin\) is a point on the northwest coast of Smith Island, South Shetland Islands situated 4.6 km north-northeast of Cape James and 4.8 km south-southwest of Lista Point.  Bulgarian early mapping in 2009.  Named after the Bulgarian writer Elin Pelin (pseudonym of Dimitar Stoyanov, 1877–1949).

Maps
Chart of South Shetland including Coronation Island, &c. from the exploration of the sloop Dove in the years 1821 and 1822 by George Powell Commander of the same. Scale ca. 1:200000. London: Laurie, 1822.
  L.L. Ivanov. Antarctica: Livingston Island and Greenwich, Robert, Snow and Smith Islands. Scale 1:120000 topographic map. Troyan: Manfred Wörner Foundation, 2010.  (First edition 2009. )
 South Shetland Islands: Smith and Low Islands. Scale 1:150000 topographic map No. 13677. British Antarctic Survey, 2009.
 Antarctic Digital Database (ADD). Scale 1:250000 topographic map of Antarctica. Scientific Committee on Antarctic Research (SCAR). Since 1993, regularly upgraded and updated.
 L.L. Ivanov. Antarctica: Livingston Island and Smith Island. Scale 1:100000 topographic map. Manfred Wörner Foundation, 2017.

References
 Elin Pelin Point. SCAR Composite Antarctic Gazetteer
 Bulgarian Antarctic Gazetteer. Antarctic Place-names Commission. (details in Bulgarian, basic data in English)

External links
 Elin Pelin Point. Copernix satellite image

Headlands of Smith Island (South Shetland Islands)
Bulgaria and the Antarctic